Vittaria longipes is a fern species in the subfamily Vittarioideae of the family Pteridaceae. It is endemic to Ecuador. Its natural habitat is subtropical or tropical moist lowland forests. It is threatened by habitat loss.

References

Pteridaceae
Ferns of Ecuador
Endemic flora of Ecuador
Ferns of the Americas
Data deficient plants
Taxonomy articles created by Polbot